OGLE-2005-BLG-390L is a star thought to be a spectral type M (a red dwarf; 95% probability, 4% probability it is a white dwarf, <1% probability it is a neutron star or black hole). This dim magnitude 16 galactic bulge star is located in the Scorpius constellation at a far distance of about 21,500 light years.

Planetary system 

OGLE-2005-BLG-390L has one known planet, which was discovered using the technique of gravitational microlensing. Indications are that the planet is about five times Earth mass, orbiting at about 2.6 astronomical units from the parent star. The discovery was announced on January 25, 2006. OGLE-2005-BLG-390Lb was once considered one of the smallest known extrasolar planets around a main sequence star, possibly rocky, with a mass around 5.5 times that of the Earth. The orbital
radius (assuming a circular orbit) of the planet is 2.6 AU, however the orbital elements are unknown. Based on its low mass and estimated temperature of around 50 K, the planet is thought to consist mainly of ices, like Pluto or Uranus, rather than being a Jupiter-like gas giant.

See also 
 List of stars with extrasolar planets
 OGLE-2005-BLG-169L
 Optical Gravitational Lensing Experiment (OGLE)

References

External links 
 OGLE: 2005-BLG-390 Event
 Small Rocky Planet Found Orbiting Normal Star
  OGLE-2005-BLG-390L b

Scorpius (constellation)
M-type main-sequence stars
Gravitational lensing
Planetary systems with one confirmed planet